Henry Russell Cohen (February 13, 1893 – April 7, 1981) was an American college football player, coach, and athletics administrator. He served as the head football coach at Louisiana State University (LSU) from 1928 to 1931 and at the University of Cincinnati from 1935 to 1937, compiling a career college football coaching record of 31–25–4.

Playing career
Cohen played as a prominent end for Dan McGugin's Vanderbilt Commodores football teams, serving as captain of its "point-a-minute" Southern Intercollegiate Athletic Association (SIAA) champion 1915 team, with the likes of Josh Cody and Irby Curry. Cohen was selected All-Southern the same year.

Coaching career
Cohen was first hired by Josh Cody at Mercer. He then scouted teams for Wallace Wade at the University of Alabama.

LSU
As was tradition for football coaches at the time, he also served as the athletics director at LSU during his tenure as head football coach. His record with the LSU Tigers was 23–13–1. McGugin recommended Cohen for the LSU job. Huey P. Long was an ardent supporter of the team.

Cohen's best year at LSU was probably his first, in 1928. Led by All-Southern captain Jess Tinsley, the Tigers posted a 6–2–1 record, suffering losses to Arkansas and Wade's Alabama. Star halfback Percy Brown broke his shoulder against Alabama. The tie was to Bill Banker and rival Tulane, which was as good as its ever been from 1929 to 1931. In 1931 LSU played its first night game in Tiger Stadium, a 31–0 victory over Spring Hill.

Cincinnati
With the Cincinnati Bearcats, he compiled an 8–12–3 mark.

Head coaching record

*Last 5 games of season were coached by Wade Woodworth.

References

External links
 

1893 births
1981 deaths
American football ends
Alabama Crimson Tide football coaches
Cincinnati Bearcats football coaches
LSU Tigers and Lady Tigers athletic directors
LSU Tigers football coaches
Mercer Bears football coaches
Vanderbilt Commodores football coaches
Vanderbilt Commodores football players
All-Southern college football players
People from Waynesboro, Georgia
Players of American football from Augusta, Georgia